New Town Road is a link road that connects Elizabeth Street to the Main Road within the greater area of Hobart, Tasmania.  This road has seen less usage since the construction of the Brooker Highway which allows traffic to move directly to the main road and onto the northern area of the state.

See also

Streets in Hobart